Many notable artists have created a wide variety of artificial intelligence art from the 1960s to today. These include:

 Sougwen Chung, active from 2010s to present. Chung's work includes performances with a robotic arm that uses AI to attempt to draw in a manner similar to Chung. 
 Harold Cohen, active from 1960s to 2010s. Cohen's work is primarily with AARON, a series of computer programs that autonomously create original images.
 Stephanie Dinkins, active from 2010s to present. Dinkins' work includes recordings of conversations with an artificially intelligent robot that resembles a black woman, discussing topics such as race and the nature of being.
 Jake Elwes, active from 2010s to present. Their practice is the exploration of artificial intelligence, queer theory and technical biases.
 Libby Heaney, active from 2010s to present.  
 Mario Klingemann, active from 2010s to present. Klingemann's works examine creativity, culture, and perception through machine learning and artificial intelligence.
 Mauro Martino, active from 2010s to present. Martino's work work includes design, data visualization and infographics.
 Eric Millikin, active from 1980s to present. Millikin's work includes AI-generated virtual reality, video art, poetry, music, and performance art, on topics such as animal rights, climate change, anti-racism, witchcraft, and the occult. 
 Trevor Paglen, active from 2000s to present. Paglen's practice includes work in photography and geography, on topics like mass surveillance and data collection. 
 Anna Ridler, active from 2010s to present. Ridler works with collections of information, including self-generated data sets, often working with floral photography.
 Karl Sims, active from 1980s to present. Sims is best known for using particle systems and artificial life in computer animation.

References

Artificial intelligence artists, List of